Ram Gopal Bajaj is an Indian theatre director, academician, and a Hindi film actor. He has also been a faculty member and a former Director of National School of Drama, New Delhi (1995 – September 2001).

He was awarded the Padma Shri in 2003 and Sangeet Natak Akademi Award in 1996 for his contribution to theatre.

Biography
Ram Gopal Bajaj graduated from the National School of Drama (NSD) in 1965. He became a member of its faculty and eventually its Director (November 1995 – September 2001). During his tenure as the head of NSD he started two theatre festivals, Bharat Rang Mahotsava (National Theatre Festival) and Jashn-e-Bachpan (National Children's Theatre Festival).

Over the years, he directed numerous plays with the National School of Drama, NSD Repertory Company, starting with Surya Ki Antim Kiran Se, Surya Ki Pehli Kiran Tak in 1974, Jai Shankar Prasad’s Skand Gupta in 1977, followed by Quaid-E-Hayaat in 1989. His other noted production was Ashadh Ka Ek Din by Mohan Rakesh in 1992. He also was the Chief of the National School of Drama, Repertory Company from 1988 to 1994. He translated Girish Karnad's Rakt Kalyan (Taledanda) into Hindi, first directed by Ebrahim Alkazi for NSD and then by Arvind Gaur (1995) for Asmita Theater.

In 2017, he was honoured with Kalidas Samman by the Government of Madhya Pradesh.

Career
Bajaj has been connected with the film industry for over three decades, first as an assistant director in art films like Utsav (1984) and Godhuli (1977), later appearing in character roles in films like, Masoom (1983), Hip Hip Hurray (1984), Mirch Masala (1985), and Chandni (1989). His most noted film roles have been in Parzania and as the Guru, in Jackie Chan starrer, The Myth, both in 2005. He starred as Dr. Amit Singh in Mango Dreams (2016) and in Jolly LLB 2 as Advocate Rizvi Sahab.

He also starred as "Shankar Dayal Bajpai" and Vikramaditya Singh" in the popular StarPlus TV serials, Navya..Naye Dhadkan Naye Sawaal (2011) and Rishton Ka Chakravyuh (2017) respectively. His latest serial was Sufiyana Pyaar Mera that aired in 2019 on Star Bharat, where he played the character of Sayyed Shehriyat "Miajaan" Shah Ghazi.

He will be seen in LSD Pvt Ltd next tv show for zeetv

His upcoming Web series is Fittrat Season 2

He is a member of the academic council of National School of Drama, New Delhi.

Filmography

Web series

See also
 Theatre in India

References

External links
 

Recipients of the Sangeet Natak Akademi Award
Recipients of the Padma Shri in arts
Indian male dramatists and playwrights
Indian theatre directors
Indian male stage actors
Indian male film actors
Male actors in Hindi cinema
National School of Drama alumni
Academic staff of the National School of Drama
1940 births
Living people
Dramatists and playwrights from Bihar
Hindi theatre
Indian arts administrators
Male actors from Bihar
Indian academic administrators
Recipients of the Sangeet Natak Akademi Fellowship